Parasola plicatilis is a small saprotrophic mushroom with a plicate cap (diameter up to 35 mm). It is a widely distributed species in Europe and North America. This ink cap species is a decomposer which can be found in grassy areas, alone, scattered or in small groups. The fruiting bodies grow at night after rain, and will self decompose after spore dispersion is achieved. Otherwise, they are quickly dried up in morning sunlight, or will eventually collapse beneath the weight of their caps.
Though nonpoisonous, the species is inedible.

The overall body resembles a cocktail umbrella. The cap is papery, and the species has no veil. Two similar species, P. hemerobia and P. leiocephala, have similar microscopic features but appear in different habitats and have unique spores.

References

External links

Psathyrellaceae
Fungi of Europe
Fungi of North America
Fungi described in 1838